Bayham (2011 Population: 6,989) is a municipality in the southeast corner of Elgin County, Ontario, Canada.  It is south of the town of Tillsonburg and Oxford County.

History
Bayham was named in 1810 for Viscount Bayham Charles Pratt, a friend of land grant recipient Colonel Talbot. The township was incorporated on January 1, 1850. The villages of Port Burwell and Vienna were incorporated as separate municipalities and separated from the township in 1949 and 1853 respectively.

In 1998, Bayham was re-amalgamated with Port Burwell and Vienna and Eden to form an expanded Municipality of Bayham.

Communities
The municipality comprises the communities of Corinth, Eden, Froggetts Corners, North Hall, Port Burwell, Richmond, Springer's Hill, Straffordville, Vienna and Wadger.

Demographics 

See also
List of townships in Ontario

References

External links

Lower-tier municipalities in Ontario
Municipalities in Elgin County